The Residences at Greenbelt is a residential skyscraper complex in Makati, Philippines. The project is developed and managed by Ayala Land. It is composed of three towers:

The Residences at Greenbelt - Laguna Tower
The Residences at Greenbelt - Manila Tower
The Residences at Greenbelt - San Lorenzo Tower

The towers are among the country's tallest, with the San Lorenzo Tower set to be the 6th tallest building in the Philippines upon completion.

See also
List of tallest buildings in Metro Manila

External links
Ayala Land Premier

Residential skyscrapers in Metro Manila
Skyscrapers in Makati